Edmund Uglow Baker (July 8, 1854 – February 22, 1911) was an American Democratic politician and businessman.

Baker was born in Linden, Wisconsin. His middle name, Uglo(w), was the maiden name of his paternal grandmother, Thomasin Uglow Baker
(1779–1841). Baker was a farmer and livestock dealer. He died in Madison, Wisconsin.

Political career
Baker served as chairman of the town board of Linden, Wisconsin. He served in the Wisconsin State Assembly from 1891 to 1893. During his term in office, he was one of 22 "perfidious" Democrats named by the Wisconsin Anti-Prohibition Association that voted against the 1891 Knapstein bill to repeal the local option.

References

External links

1854 births
1911 deaths
People from Linden, Wisconsin
Businesspeople from Wisconsin
19th-century American politicians
19th-century American businesspeople
Democratic Party members of the Wisconsin State Assembly